Anwar Farrukhabadi, also known as "Fana", was a Sufi poet from Farrukhabad district in India. He is known as a lyricist of Ghazal, songs, poems and Qawaali.

Work 

He also wrote Marsiya (مرثیہ ) and Mashhoor Daastan Hai Shahadat Hussain Ki (مشہور داساتاں ہے شہادت حسینؑ کی ), sung by Shamshad Begum and Yusuf Ad. His ghazal Yeh jo halka halka saroor hai  has been renditioned by various artists including Nusrat Fateh Ali Khan, Farhan Saeed and featured in the Hindi movie Fanney Khan.

Farrukhabadi died in Farrukhabad on June 29, 2011.

Filmography

References

Sufi poets
1928 births
2011 deaths
20th-century Indian poets
Indian male poets
Poets from Uttar Pradesh
People from Farrukhabad district
20th-century Indian male writers